Artyom Vruyrovich Simonyan (born 20 February 1995) is an Armenian footballer who plays as a right winger for SKA-Khabarovsk.

Career

Club
On 9 August 2017, Simonyan signed for FC Alashkert.

On 2 July 2020, FC Pyunik announced that Simonyan had left the club after his contract had expired.

On 17 January 2021, Tom Tomsk announced the signing of Simonyan on a contract until the end of the 2020–21 season.

On 14 July 2022, Simonyan signed a one-year contract with Russian Premier League club Torpedo Moscow. Simonyan's contract with Torpedo was terminated by mutual consent in late 2022.

On 15 February 2023, Simonyan signed for SKA-Khabarovsk on an 18-month contract.

Career statistics

Club

International

References

External links
 
 
 

1995 births
Footballers from Saint Petersburg
Russian people of Armenian descent
Citizens of Armenia through descent
Living people
Russian footballers
Armenian footballers
Armenia youth international footballers
Armenia international footballers
Association football midfielders
FC Zenit Saint Petersburg players
FC Zürich players
FC Le Mont players
FC Alashkert players
FC Ararat Yerevan players
FC Pyunik players
FC Tom Tomsk players
FC Volgar Astrakhan players
FC Torpedo Moscow players
FC SKA-Khabarovsk players
Swiss Promotion League players
Swiss Super League players
Swiss Challenge League players
Armenian Premier League players
Russian First League players
Russian Premier League players
Armenian expatriate footballers
Expatriate footballers in Switzerland
Armenian expatriate sportspeople in Switzerland